Claude Ignace François Michaud (28 October 1751 – 19 October 1835) commanded French troops during the French Revolutionary Wars, rising to command the Army of the Rhine in 1794. After serving in a cavalry regiment from 1780 to 1783 he returned to civilian life. During the French Revolution he became lieutenant colonel of a volunteer battalion. In 1793 he was promoted to both general of brigade and general of division. He led a division at Haguenau and Second Wissembourg.

When Jean-Charles Pichegru was transferred to lead the Army of the North in January 1794, Michaud was elevated to army command somewhat unwillingly. That year he led the army at Schifferstadt and the Vosges. The army was consolidated with the Army of Rhin-et-Moselle in April 1795. He commanded posts in the interior until 1800 when he led troops at the Mincio in Italy. He commanded soldiers in Holland and North Germany from 1805 to 1813 during the First French Empire. He retired in 1814 and died in 1835. MICHAUD is one of the names inscribed under the Arc de Triomphe, on Column 13.

References

 

French generals
French military personnel of the French Revolutionary Wars
French Republican military leaders of the French Revolutionary Wars
Military leaders of the French Revolutionary Wars
Counts of the First French Empire
People from Doubs
1751 births
1835 deaths
Names inscribed under the Arc de Triomphe